The mean center of the United States population is determined by the United States Census Bureau from the results of each national census. The Bureau defines it as follows:

Nearly 79% of the overall southerly movement happened between 1950 and 2000.

Location information since 1790

See also
 Center of population
 Median center of United States population
 Geographic center of the United States
 Geographic center of the contiguous United States

References

Demographics of the United States
Center of population